Terry Dyer (born 28 January 1977) is a Dominican former international footballer who played as a midfielder.

Career
He made his international debut for Dominica in 2004, and appeared in FIFA World Cup qualifying matches.

References

1977 births
Living people
Dominica footballers
Dominica international footballers
Association football midfielders